Catherine Janice Yap de Belen (born November 9, 1968), better known as Janice de Belen, is a Filipino actress, commercial model and Television presenter She is dubbed as the "Queen of Horror-Drama" for her acting prowess and exceptional portrayals in both Filipino drama and horror films.

Dhe began her career in show business as a child star, and her breakthrough came when she played the title role in the soap opera Flordeluna, which aired from 1979 until 1984. She was hailed as the "80s Teen Drama Princess" alongside then showbiz rival Julie Vega.

As an acclaimed actress and TV personality, De Belen is a FAMAS Award winner (including three Best Actress nominations). In 2020, she won "Best Actress in a Drama Series" alongside Angel Locsin, Maricel Soriano and Eula Valdez at the 18th Gawad Tanglaw Awards. The same year, she also won "Best Drama Supporting Actress" at the 33rd PMPC Star Awards for Television. She won "Best Actress" in the 2021 International Film Festival Manhattan. In 2022, she won "Best Supporting Actress" at the 70th FAMAS Awards for her exceptional performance in Big Night!.

Early life
Janice Catherine Yap de Belen was born on 9 November 1968 to Philip Ilagan de Belen and Cynthia Susan Jimenez Yap. She has a younger sister, Gelli, who is also an actress. On March 19, 2016, her mother died at the age of 67 due to multiple organ failure.

Career
At the age of nine, she became a newscaster for NewsWatch Kids Edition. She got her biggest break from the same channel when she got the lead role in the soap opera Flordeluna a TV soap where she played Flor from 1979 until 1984, when she momentarily quit showbiz to continue her studies. The soap continued to air a few more years after Janice left but it started going on a downward trend and never regained its popularity. De Belen returned to showbiz, returning to TV with the soap Jesy and the early evening variety show The Big, Big Show. She was considered the "80s Teen Drama Princess" alongside Julie Vega, whose soap Anna Liza provided stiff competition to Flordeluna. The two TV rivals co-starred in a number of '80s films, mostly produced by Regal Films. In 1982, De Belen was partnered with Gabby Concepcion through the films Puppy Love" and Home Sweet Home. De Belen was known for her relationship with Aga Muhlach, with whom she had child, and her tumultuous relationship with now ex-husband John Estrada. She returned to the world of TV in soap in 1985 with Andrea Amor and Don Camote dela Mancha, both aired on GMA 7. Her transformation from a teenage star to a serious actress started in 1989 when she topbilled Mina Films' Rosenda"/ opposite erstwhile boyfriend Gabby Concepcion. She received her first Best Actress, the Raha Sulayman Award, recognition in 1991 over Vision Films' Kailan ka Magiging Akin, a Manila Film Festival entry. In 2001–2010, after her separation from Estrada, she hosted the morning talk show SiS also on GMA-7 with sister Gelli De Belen and their friend Carmina Villarroel. In 2011–2012, she starred in the TV series Budoy. She followed it up with performance in the television series Ina, Kapatid, Anak which aired on the Primetime Bida Block and worldwide through TFC from 2012–2013. She co-hosted Showbiz Inside Report as well from February 2012 to October 2013 and until recently, was also doing Buzz ng Bayan with Boy Abunda. In 2016, she moved back to GMA to appear in Destined to Be Yours and My Korean Jagiya. In 2018, she returned to ABS-CBN and was cast in The General's Daughter and Sino ang Maysala?: Mea Culpa.

Filmography
Film

Television/Digital

Awards
2021, Best Actress. International Film Festival Manhattan.
2020, Best Actress in a drama series for "The General's Daughter" at 18th Gawad Tanglaw
2020, Best Acting Ensemble in a Drama Series for The General's Daughter at the 51st Guillermo Mendoza Memorial Awards Scholarship Foundation (GMMSF) Box Office Entertainment Awards.
2019, Best Drama Supporting Actress, 33rd PMPC Star Awards for Television for "The General's Daughter"
2019, Cine Sandaan Loveteam Category, Honorees, Janice de Belen and Aga Muchlach.
2016, Best Actress - World Premiers Film Festival for Ringgo: The Dog Shooter.
2013, Movie Supporting Actress of the Year, PMPC Star Awards for Movies for Tiktik: The Aswang Chronicles2012, Best Actress - Directors Showcase, Cinemalaya Independent Film Festival for Mga Mumunting Lihim2012, Best Supporting Actress - Directors Showcase, Cinemalaya Independent Film Festival for Mga Mumunting Lihim2010, Best Actress - Young Critics Circle, Philippines for Last Viewing2010, Best Actress - Gawad Pasado Awards for Last Viewing1991, Best Actress, Manila Film Festival for Kailan Ka Magiging Akin?Winner, Best Celebrity Talk Show for SIS, 2007 PMPC Star Awards for TV
Winner, Best Celebrity Talk Show for SIS, 2009 PMPC Star Awards for TV
Winner, Best Celebrity Talk Show for SIS, 2009 Catholic Mass Media Awards (CMMA) 
Winner, Best Celebrity Talk Show Host for Spoon, 2009 PMPC Star Awards For TV
Winner, Best Celebrity Talk Show Host for Spoon, 2010, PMPC Star Awards for TV
Recipient, Eastwood City "Walk of Fame 2010". 
Winner, Best Celebrity Talk Show for Spoon, 2010, PMPC Star Awards
Winner, Best Celebrity Talk Show host for Spoon, 2011, PMPC Star Awards for TV
Winner, Best Magazine Program Host (Celebrity Talk Show Host), 2011, 20th KBP Golden Dove Awards
Winner, Best Actress for Budoy, 2013 Gawad Tanglaw Awards 
Winner, Best Actress for Ina Kapatid Anak'', 2013 KBP Golden Dove Awards
Winner, Best Celebrity Talk Show Host, 2013 Golden Screen Awards for Television

References

External links
Official website
Janice de Belen at iGMA.tv

1968 births
Living people
20th-century Filipino actresses
21st-century Filipino actresses
GMA Network personalities
ABS-CBN personalities
Actresses from Metro Manila
Ateneo de Manila University alumni
Filipino child actresses
Filipino women comedians
Filipino female models
Filipino film actresses
Filipino television actresses
People from Quezon City